Joraram Puraram Kumawat (born 7 May 1964) is an Indian politician from Rajasthan, India and a member of the Rajasthan Legislative Assembly representing Sumerpur for the Bharatiya Janata Party. He was elected to the lower house in 2018, for his first term in the house.

References

Bharatiya Janata Party politicians from Rajasthan
Rajasthan MLAs 2018–2023
1964 births
Living people